The 1967 Florida State Seminoles football team represented Florida State University as an independent during the 1967 NCAA University Division football season. Led by eighth-year head coach Bill Peterson, the Seminoles compiled a record of 7–2–2. Florida State was invited to the Gator Bowl, where they tied Penn State.

Schedule

Roster

 QB #14 Bill Cappleman, So.

References

Florida State
Florida State Seminoles football seasons
Florida State Seminoles football